Degrees-R-Us is an unaccredited institution that offers degrees of higher learning. USA Today reported it is a diploma mill. In 2004, it was included in a Senate investigation.

The operation was run by a disbarred attorney from his Las Vegas home and "a GAO investigator ordered those bogus degrees in the name of Sen. Susan Collins (R) of Maine, who had commissioned the agency to investigate the ease of purchasing such degrees."

Connected institutions
Lexington University, a dormant institution purportedly located in Middletown, New York, which is different from Lexington College, a regionally accredited institution

See also
List of unaccredited institutions of higher learning
University Degree Program

References

External links
US Senate Investigation
Christian Science Monitor

Unaccredited institutions of higher learning in the United States